Lehututu is a village in Kgalagadi District of Botswana. It is in the Kalahari Desert, and it has primary and secondary schools. The population was 1,956 in 2011 census.

References

Kgalagadi District
Villages in Botswana